Stealing From Our Favorite Thieves is the first full-length album by The Van Pelt, an indie rock band from New York City, released in 1996.

Track listing
His Steppe Is My Prairie
It's A Suffering	
Shame On You
Magic Fantasy (We Are Provincial)	
You Are The Glue
Simone Never Had It This Good	
His Saxophone Is My Guitar
It's New To Me
Turning Twenty Into Two

Personnel
Toko Yasuda (bass, backing vocals)
Neil O'Brien (drums)
Chris Leo (vocals, guitar, lyrics)
David Baum (guitar, backing vocals)

References

External links
http://www.discogs.com/Van-Pelt-Stealing-From-Our-Favorite-Thieves/release/1542577

1996 debut albums
The Van Pelt albums